Coleotrype baronii is a dayflower plant species described by John Gilbert Baker. It is native to Madagascar.

References

Commelinaceae
Endemic flora of Madagascar